Mahabal's day gecko (Cnemaspis mahabali) is a species of gecko found in India.

References
 Sayyed, A., Pyron, R.A. & Dileepkumar, R. (2018) Four new species of the genus Cnemaspis Strauch, (Sauria: Gekkonidae)
from the northern Western Ghats, India. Amphibian & Reptile Conservation, 12 (e157), 1–29.

Reptiles of India
Endemic fauna of India
Reptiles described in 2018